Giuseppe De Luigi (4 October 1908 in Bigarello – 8 February 1982 in Genoa) was an Italian artist (paintings, sculptures).

Life 
Giuseppe De Luigi was an Italian artist who drew his inspiration from a clever use of light and colours. He was born on 4 October 1908, in Stradella di Bigarello near Mantua

From his childhood, he shows a particular aptitude for drawing, he early tests his skill for watercolour, oil painting, wax and plaster sculptures.

In 1924 he attended Palazzo Ducale in Mantua where he studies the masterpieces of those great artists who operated there in the past, above all Andrea Mantegna, Giulio Romano. He learns the technique of fresco under the direction of important restorers.

From 1926 to 1930 he wins scholarships of the town-council of Bigarello and of the Institute Giuseppe Franchetti; in this way, he can follow painting courses in Firenze. At Fiesole, he learns the art of pottery in a workshop. At famous "Caffè Giubbe Rosse", a cafè in Florence where the Italian Futurist movement (Futurismo) blossomed, he met artists and intellectuals as Ardengo Soffici, Giovanni Papini e Piero Bargellini.

Coming back to Mantua, he begins his artistic life. In 1931 he exhibited two works at the “Prima Mostra Provinciale d’Arte”; in 1932 he is mentioned in the volume “Artisti”  edited by “Libreria del Milione” 1932-XI, together with Manzù, Tomea, Sassu, Lorenzetti, Giorgi. In 1936 he opens a studio with the sculptor A. Seguri in Bellalancia Street.

In 1938, he marries Giulia Danesi and they have four children.

In 1943, the war forces the young family to move to Castel Goffredo. Later, in 1952, they come to Milan. De Luigi takes part in the cultural life of this town, becoming a protagonist of the 19th-century art: he attends art galleries, cultural institutions, he makes exhibitions, he is present to collective art shows, he is quoted in remarkable artistic publications, he is given awards and receives great appreciations.
He dies on February 8, 1982 in Genoa. His works are still in great demand from critics and artistic institutions.

In the town where he was born, a considerable number of his paintings can now be seen and appreciated in museums and foundations, Bigarello public administration has dedicated the City Library to Giuseppe De Luigi. In 2013, thanks the collaboration of xDams organisation has started a project to create a digital archive with pictures, photos and documents about Giuseppe De Luigi

References

External links 
 www.giuseppedeuigi.com Artist on line archives 2014  Text available under a CC BY-SA 3.0 Licence
 Giuseppe De Luigi Digital Archives Project

Bibliography 

 Elena De Luigi Luvié, Renzo Margonari, Giuseppe De Luigi. Antologica, Mantova, 2006. IT\ICCU\LO1\1282865 - Libraries Italian National Catalogue
 Alberto Sartori, Arianna Sartori, Artisti a Mantova nei secoli XIX e XX, vol. II, Bozzolo, 2000.
 Arianna Sartori, Catalogo Sartori d'arte moderna e contemporanea, Cremona, 2012. IT\ICCU\TO0\1863789 - Libraries Italian National Catalogue
 Stefano Cortina, Giuseppe De Luigi. Primordi di luce, Milano, 2012 [Braidense.it Library]
 Sandro Bini, Artisti, Milano, Libreria del milione, 1932 IT\ICCU\RAV\0237414 - Libraries Italian National Catalogue

1908 births
1982 deaths
Artists from Milan
20th-century Italian painters
Italian male painters
Modern painters
20th-century Italian sculptors
20th-century Italian male artists
Italian male sculptors